Vidyardhi  is a 2004 Telugu-language romantic drama film directed by Balachari, who worked as an assistant director for S. Shankar and Bhagyaraj. The film stars newcomer Ramesh and Aditi Agarwal  in the lead roles, with Prakash Raj and Rahul Dev in pivotal roles.

Plot 
A mafia don, Salim Ibrahim, creates issues at an engineering college by killing the chairman and closing the campus. The rest of the plot is how a student, Kranthi, saves his college.

Cast 

 Ramesh as Kranthi
Aditi Agarwal as Jahnavi 
Prakash Raj
Rahul Dev as Salim Ibrahim
Brahmanandam
Kovai Sarala
Tanikella Bharani
Giri Babu
Venu Gopal
Anil
Rajitha
Vizag Prasad
Malladi Raghava
Navabharat Balaji
Abhinaya Krishna

Soundtrack 
The soundtrack was composed by Mani Sharma.
"Sye Syete" – Ganapathi
"Hyderabad Hai" – Krishnaraj
"Oke Okkasari" – S. P. B. Charan
"Virise Prathi" – Hariharan
"Empilla" – Mallikarjun
"Andhra Khiladi Vidyardhi" - Tippu, Mahalakshmi, Premji (chorus/rap)

Production 
The muhurat of the film was at Annapurna Studios in October 2003. The chief guests included Harikrishna, Jagapati Babu, Uday Kiran, Tarun, Jeevitha, D Ramanaidu, Allu Arvind, M.S. Raju, NV Prasad, and Ashok Kumar. This film marked the acting debut of R. B. Choudary's son, Ramesh. Mamata Zhaveri, who acted in television commercials, was selected to play the lead actress. The film was shot primarily in Hyderabad and Mumbai. The first schedule of the film was on October 27. Zhaveri was later replaced with Aditi Agarwal. The film was scheduled to  release in April 2004, but was further delayed to December.

Release 
The film released to negative reviews. Idlebrain criticized the contrasting first and second halves of the film. The second half of the film is reminiscent of Sye. Full Hyderabad criticized the film's vulgarity. The film did not run well.

References

External links 
 

2004 films
2000s Telugu-language films
Indian thriller films
Films scored by Mani Sharma
2004 directorial debut films
2004 thriller films